Eutylone (also known as β-keto-1,3-benzodioxolyl-N-ethylbutanamine, bk-EBDB, and N-ethylbutylone) is a stimulant and empathogenic compound developed in the 1960s, which is classified as a designer drug. It was first reported to the EMCDDA in 2014 and became widespread internationally in 2019-2020 following bans on the related compound ephylone. It is not a natural, but a synthetic cathinone. In 2021, eutylone was the most common cathinone identified by the Drug Enforcement Administration in the United States.

Legal status 

Sweden's public health agency suggested classifying eutylone as a hazardous substance, on September 25, 2019.

In the United States Eutylone is considered a schedule 1 controlled substance as a positional isomer of Pentylone

See also
 5-Methylethylone
 Butylone
 Ethyl-J
 Ethylone
 Ephylone
 N-Ethylhexedrone
 N-Ethylhexylone
 N-Ethylheptylone

References 

Cathinones
Designer drugs
Benzodioxoles
Serotonin-norepinephrine-dopamine releasing agents
Entactogens and empathogens